Jessica Correia (born June 16, 1999) is a Portuguese female acrobatic gymnast. With partners Iris Mendes and Barbara da Silva Sequeira, Correia achieved 8th in the 2014 Acrobatic Gymnastics World Championships.

References

1999 births
Living people
Portuguese acrobatic gymnasts
Female acrobatic gymnasts